A mantle is a layer inside a planetary body bounded below by a core and above by a crust. Mantles are made of rock or ices, and are generally the largest and most massive layer of the planetary body. Mantles are characteristic of planetary bodies that have undergone differentiation by density.  All terrestrial planets (including Earth), a number of asteroids, and some planetary moons have mantles.

Earth's mantle 

The Earth's mantle is a layer of silicate rock between the crust and the outer core. Its mass of 4.01 × 1024 kg is 67% the mass of the Earth. It has a thickness of  making up about 84% of Earth's volume. It is predominantly solid, but in geological time it behaves as a viscous fluid. Partial melting of the mantle at mid-ocean ridges produces oceanic crust, and partial melting of the mantle at subduction zones produces continental crust.

Other planetary mantles 

Moons with mantles 
Jupiter's moons Io, Europa, and Ganymede have silicate mantles; Io's ~ silicate mantle is overlain by a volcanic crust, Ganymede's ~ thick silicate mantle is overlain by ~ of ice, and Europa's ~ km silicate mantle is overlain by ~ of ice and possibly liquid water.

The silicate mantle of the Earth's moon is approximately 1300–1400 km thick, and is the source of mare basalts. The lunar mantle might be exposed in the South Pole-Aitken basin or the Crisium basin. The lunar mantle contains a seismic discontinuity at ~ depth, most likely related to a change in composition.

Titan and Triton each have a mantle made of ice or other solid volatile substances.

Asteroids with mantles 

Some of the largest asteroids have mantles; for example, Vesta has a silicate mantle similar in composition to diogenite meteorites.

See also
 Earth's internal heat budget
 Lehmann discontinuity
 Mantle xenoliths
 Mantle convection
 Mesosphere (mantle)
 Numerical modeling (geology)
 Primitive mantle

References

Further reading 
 Don L. Anderson, Theory of the Earth, Blackwell (1989), is a textbook dealing with the Earth's interior and is now available on the web. Retrieved 2007-12-23.
 
 Nixon, Peter H. (1987). Mantle xenoliths: J. Wiley & Sons, 844p.,.
 Donald L. Turcotte and Gerald Schubert, Geodynamics, Cambridge University Press, Third Edition (2014),  (Hardback)  (Paperback)

External links 

 The Biggest Dig: Japan builds a ship to drill to the earth's mantle – Scientific American (September 2005)
 Information on the Mohole Project

Structure of the Earth
Planetary geology